The Menasco Buccaneer was a series of popular six-cylinder, air-cooled, in-line, inverted, aero-engines, that were manufactured by Menasco Motors Company for light general aviation and sport aircraft during the 1930s and 1940s.

The six-cylinder Menasco engines had the name Buccaneer, while the four-cylinder engines had the name Pirate.  The Menasco engines came in both supercharged and  normally aspirated models. The supercharged models, with the S suffix added to their designation, had superior performance at higher altitudes with a relatively small increase in dimensions and weight.

Variants
Menasco A6 Buccaneer

Menasco B6 Buccaneer

Menasco B6S Buccaneer

Menasco C6 Buccaneer

Menasco C6S Super Buccaneer

Menasco D6 Super Buccaneer

Applications
 Alcor C-6-1 Junior
 Bellanca 28-92
 Brown B-2 Racer
 Brown B-3
 Chester Goon
 Crosby CR-4
 Fokker S.IX/2
 Folkerts SK-3
 Howard DGA-4
 Miles Mohawk
 Miles Peregrine
 Northrop Beta 3
 Northrop N-9M
 PZL.26
 Rider R-6
 VEF I-14
 Waco Custom Cabin MGC-8

Specifications (Menasco B6S Buccaneer)

See also

References

 
 

Air-cooled aircraft piston engines
1930s aircraft piston engines
Inverted aircraft piston engines
Straight-six engines
Buccaneer